Reformists Coalition may refer to:
 Council for Coordinating the Reforms Front, main umbrella organization of Iranian Reformists since 1999
 Reformists Coalition (2006), electoral alliance for Iranian local elections, 2006
 Reformists Coalition (2008), electoral alliance for Iranian legislative election, 2008
 Reformists Coalition (2013), electoral alliance for Iranian local elections, 2013